The 2017–18 season was Al-Fayha's  64th year in existence and first season in the Pro League. This season Al-Fayha participated in the Pro League, King Cup and Crown Prince Cup. 

The season covered the period from 1 July 2017 to 30 June 2018.

Players

Current squad

Out on loan

Transfers

In

Loans in

Out

Loans out

Competitions

Pre-season friendlies

Pro League

League table

Results summary

Results by round

Matches
All times are local, AST (UTC+3).

King Cup
Al-Fayha will enter the King Cup in the Round of 32 alongside the other Pro League teams. All times are local, AST (UTC+3).

Crown Prince Cup

On 19 September 2017, it was announced that the tournament was cancelled.
All times are local, AST (UTC+3).

Statistics

Appearances

Last updated on 12 April 2018.

|-
! colspan=14 style=background:#dcdcdc; text-align:center|Goalkeepers

|-
! colspan=14 style=background:#dcdcdc; text-align:center|Defenders

|-
! colspan=14 style=background:#dcdcdc; text-align:center|Midfielders

|-
! colspan=14 style=background:#dcdcdc; text-align:center|Forwards

|-
! colspan=14 style=background:#dcdcdc; text-align:center| Players sent out on loan this season

|-
|}

Goalscorers

Last Updated: 12 April 2018

Clean sheets

Last Updated: 10 March 2018

References

Al-Fayha FC seasons
Fayha